This page details the match results and statistics of the Guinea-Bissau national football team from 2020 to present.

Results
Guinea-Bissau's score is shown first in each case.

Notes

References

External links
Guinea-Bissau » Fixtures & Results 2020 at worldfootball.net
Guinea-Bissau » Fixtures & Results 2021 at worldfootball.net

Guinea-Bissau national football team results
2020s in Guinea-Bissau